Brand X were a British jazz fusion band formed in London in 1974. They were active until 1980, followed by a reformation between 1992 and 1999, and were active following a 2016 reunion until 2021. Members have included John Goodsall (guitar), Percy Jones (bass), Robin Lumley (keyboards), and Phil Collins (drums). Jones was the sole constant member throughout the band's existence until October 2020 when he left the band. Founding member Goodsall died on 10 November 2021 and Lumley died on 9 March 2023.

History

1974–1980: First incarnation

In 1974, rehearsals began for developing a five-piece instrumental jazz fusion group at Island Studios in London, which was set to include Percy Jones on bass and Phil Collins (of Genesis) on drums. They had secured a recording deal with Island Records and prepared tracks for a studio album which originally included vocals. However, the vocals were negatively received from Island management, leaving the group to write new material, at the suggestion of Island A&R man Richard Williams. With Collins tied up with other commitments, the band settled on a founding line-up of Jones, John Goodsall on guitar, Robin Lumley on keyboards and vocals, Pete Bonas on guitar, John Dillon on drums and percussion, and Phil Spinelli on percussion and lead vocals. Dillon had left by the end of 1974, and a newly available Collins took his place in 1975. The four recorded Unorthodox Behaviour in September and October 1975 at Trident Studios with Jack Lancaster on saxophone. They were named Brand X after Island Records staffer Danny Wilding wrote down "Brand X" to keep track of their activity on the studio calendar, and the name stuck. In preparation for their upcoming gigs, the four were joined by Geoff Seopardi on percussion by December 1975. Genesis manager Tony Smith became their manager.

Brand X played their first gigs with a series of low key warm-up shows in November and December 1975. These were followed by a full-scale tour across the UK from February 1976, mainly on the college circuit. They had little funds, resorting to renting a synthesiser and PA system, operated with a small road crew, and often played support for the headlining act. Moroccan Roll was released in April 1977 and peaked at No. 37 in the UK and No. 125 in the US. With Collins leaving the group for other commitments, Kenwood Dennard of Pat Martino's group was recruited in New York City in time for their 32-date US tour in May and June 1977. Collins briefly returned later in 1977 for a series of dates, including a spot at the tenth Crystal Palace Garden Party in London and the Fête de l'Humanité in Paris on the same day on a specially chartered plane, the latter attended by an estimated 200,000 people.

Following the 1977 tour, the band would recruit keyboardist Peter Robinson and Chuck Burgi on drums to record the  Masques album. Released in 1978, it was the first and only Brand X album during the period to not feature Phil Collins on drums. The band would once again embark on a tour to promote this album in 1978, with a couple different drummers in place of Chuck Burgi. The next year, 1979, signalled the end of Brand X's recording sessions for over 10 years. It was in this time that they would record  Product that same year, Do They Hurt? in 1980, and 1982's Is There Anything About?.Following the completion of the recording sessions, the band embarked on a world tour, following which Collins departed for the final time. Clark returned to the drum stool, and the band toured the UK in April and May 1980 (co-headlining with Bruford).

With the passing of John Goodsall, Percy Jones and Robin Lumley confirmed on Facebook, on 14 November 2021, that the Brand X name is now officially retired.  No further activity will be done under that name.

Discography
Studio albums
Unorthodox Behaviour (1976)
Moroccan Roll (1977) - UK No. 37
Masques (1978)
Product (1979) - US No. 165 
Do They Hurt? (1980) - US No. 204
Is There Anything About? (1982) UK No. 93
X-Communication (1992)
Manifest Destiny (1997)

Live albums
Livestock (1977) - largely recorded at Ronnie Scott's Jazz Club Aug/Sept 76 - US No. 204
Live at the Roxy L.A. (1997) - recorded 23 September 1979 (taken from a band members' cassette from the venue's PA mixing desk)
Timeline (2000) - live concerts 16 November 1977 Chicago & 21 June 1993 NYC
But Wait... There's More! - LIVE 2017 (2017) - recorded on 6 January 2017 at the Sellersville Theatre, PA
Locked & Loaded (2018) - recorded live June 2017, Longs Park Amphitheater, Lancaster, Pennsylvania
Live from the Rites of Spring Festival (2018) - recorded on May 6 2018 at the Majestic Theatre, Gettysburg, Pennsylvania

Compilation albums
The Plot Thins: A History of Brand X (1992) - select tracks from Unorthodox Behaviour to Do They Hurt?

Members

Last members
Percy Jones - bass guitar (2016–2021)
John Goodsall - guitars (2016–2021)
Chris Clark – keyboards, synthesisers (2016–2021)
Scott Weinberger – percussion (2016–2021)
Kenny Grohowski – drums (2017–2021)

John Goodsall died on 10 November 2021 at The Mayo Clinic Rochester in Minnesota from complications due to Covid-19. Robin Lumley died on 9 March 2023.

References

External links
 Brand X Performances
 Genesis News Com : Brand X - Special: An Unorthodox History - Part 2
 Brand X Official Store - Official YouTube channel
 
 

Musical groups established in 1975
Musical groups disestablished in 2021
Musical groups from London
Jazz fusion ensembles
British jazz ensembles
1975 establishments in England
2021 disestablishments in England
Charisma Records artists
CBS Records artists
Columbia Records artists
Epic Records artists
Vertigo Records artists